Lelya is a monotypic genus of flowering plants belonging to the family Rubiaceae. It only contains one known species, Lelya osteocarpa Bremek. 

Its native range is Tropical Africa. It is found in Angola, Malawi, Nigeria, Tanzania, Zambia and Zaïre.

The genus name of Lelya is in honour of Hugh Vandervaes Lely (1891–1947), an English botanist and forester in Nigeria. The Latin specific epithet of osteocarpa is derived from 2 words, osteo from the Greek word meaning bone and also carpa is derived from carpus meaning fruit.
Both genus and species were first described and published in Verh. Kon. Ned. Akad. Wetensch., Afd. Natuurk., Sect. 2, Vol.48 (Issue 2) on page 181 in 1952.

References

Rubiaceae
Rubiaceae genera
Plants described in 1952
Flora of South Tropical Africa
Flora of East Tropical Africa